North Macedonia has a multi-party system, with numerous parties which must work with each other to form coalition governments.

Parties in the Parliament

Extra-parliamentary parties
Macedonian:
YOURS Political Party (ТВОЈА партија), independent.
Party for European Future (Партија за Европска Иднина), with the SDSM
United for Macedonia (Обединети за Македонија), with the SDSM
MAAK-Conservative Party (МААК-Конзервативна Партија), with VMRO-DPMNE
Macedonian Progressive Party (Македонска Напредна Партија), with VMRO-DPMNE
Union of Tito's Left Forces (Сојуз на Титови Леви Сили), with VMRO-DPMNE
Communist Party of Macedonia (Kомунистичката партија на Македонија), with The Left
Integra-Macedonian Conservative Party (Интегра-македонска конзервативна партија)
Liberal Party of Macedonia (Либерална Партија на Македонија)
Social Democratic Party of Macedonia (Социјалдемократска партија на Македонија)
Voice for Macedonia (Глас за Македонија)
 (Трајно македонско радикално обединување, TMRO)
 (Татковинска македонска организација за радикална обнова - Вардар - Егеј - Пирин, TMORO-VEP), with VMRO-DPMNE

Albanian:
National Democratic Revival (Rilindja Demokratike Kombëtare/Национална Демократска Преродба)
Party for Democratic Prosperity (Partija za demokratski prosperitet/Партија за демократски просперитет)

Minority:
Democratic Union of the Vlachs of Macedonia (Unia Democratã a Armãnjlor dit Machidunii/Демократски сојуз на Власите од Македонија)
Party of the Vlachs of Macedonia (Partia Armãnjilor ditu Machidunie/Партија на Власите од Македонија)
 (Türk Hareket Partisi/Партија за движење на Турците, PDT)
Movement for Turkish National Union (Türk Milli Birlik Hareketi/Движење за Турско Национално Единство)
Democratic League of Bosniaks (Demokratski Savez Bošnjaka/Демократска Лига на Бошњаците)
Union of Roma in Macedonia (Сојуз на Ромите од Македонија)
Party for the Full Emancipation of the Roma of Macedonia (Партија за целосна еманципација на Ромите)
{ill|Democratic Forces of the Roma|mk|Демократски сили на Ромите|sv|Romernas demokratiska krafter i Makedonien}} (Демократски сили на Ромите)
Serbian Progressive Party in Macedonia (Srpska Napredna Stranka u Makedoniji/Српска напредна странка во Македонија)
 (Srpska Stranka u Makedoniji/Српска странка во Македонија)

Defunct parties
Democratic Alternative (Demokratska Alternativa/Демократска Алтернатива)
Democratic Centre (Demokratski centar/Демократски Центар)
Communist Party of Macedonia (Sojuz na Komunistite na Makedonija/Сојуз на комунистите на Македонија'
National Democratic Party (Nacionala Demokratska Partija/Национална Демократска Партија)
New Democracy (Demokracia e Re/Nova Demokratija/Нова Демократија)
Workers' Party (Rabotnicka Partija/Работничка Партија)
Party of Free Democrats (Partija na Sloboni Demokrati/Партија на слободни демократи'')

See also
Politics of North Macedonia
List of political parties by country
Liberalism in North Macedonia

North Macedonia
 
Political parties
Political parties
North Macedonia